Patrick Baur (born 3 May 1965) is a German former professional tennis player.

During his career Baur won 2 singles titles and 2 doubles titles.  He achieved a career-high singles ranking of World No. 74 in 1991 and a career-high doubles ranking of World No. 64 in 1989.

Career finals

Singles (2 titles)

Doubles (2 titles, 2 runner-ups)

External links
 
 

1965 births
Living people
German male tennis players
People from Radolfzell
Sportspeople from Freiburg (region)
West German male tennis players
Tennis people from Baden-Württemberg